Wild at Heart is a 1990 American black comedy romantic crime film written and directed by David Lynch and starring Nicolas Cage, Laura Dern, Diane Ladd, Willem Dafoe, Harry Dean Stanton, and Isabella Rossellini. Based on the 1989 novel of the same name by Barry Gifford, it tells the story of Sailor Ripley (Cage) and Lula Pace Fortune (Dern), a young couple from Cape Fear, North Carolina, who go on the run from Lula's domineering mother and the gangsters she hires to kill Sailor.

Lynch was going to produce, but after reading Gifford's book, he decided to write and direct as well. He did not like the ending of the novel and thus decided to change it to fit his vision of the main characters. Wild at Heart is a road movie which includes allusions to The Wizard of Oz and Elvis Presley and his movies.

Early test screenings for Wild at Heart had a poor reception; Lynch estimated that 300 people walked out of an early screening. On release, the film had mixed critical reviews and grossed $14 million against its $10 million budget. The film won the Palme d'Or at the 1990 Cannes Film Festival, which at the time was considered a controversial decision. Diane Ladd was nominated for the Academy Award for Best Supporting Actress for her performance. It has since been positively re-evaluated by critics.

Plot
Lovers Lula and Sailor are separated after he is jailed for killing a man who attacked him with a knife; the assailant, Bobby Ray Lemon, was hired by Lula's mother, Marietta Fortune. Upon Sailor's release, Lula picks him up outside prison, where she hands him his snakeskin jacket. They go to a hotel where she reserved a room, make love and go to see the speed metal band Powermad. At the club, Sailor gets into a fight with a man who flirts with Lula, and then leads the band in a rendition of the Elvis Presley song "Love Me". Later, back in their hotel room, after making love again, Sailor and Lula finally decide to run away to California, breaking Sailor's parole. Marietta arranges for private detective Johnnie Farragut—her on-off boyfriend—to find them and bring them back. But unbeknownst to Farragut, Marietta also hires gangster Marcello Santos to track them and kill Sailor. Santos's minions capture and kill Farragut, sending Marietta into a guilt-fueled psychosis.

Unaware of all of the events happening back in North Carolina, Lula and Sailor continue on their way until they witness—according to Lula—a bad omen: the aftermath of a two-car accident, and the only survivor, a young woman, dying in front of them. With little money left, Sailor heads for Big Tuna, Texas, where he contacts his old acquaintance Perdita Durango, who might be able to help them, although she secretly knows Lula's mother has a contract out for his murder. Lula, who has been feeling ill, tells Sailor she is pregnant with his child. While Sailor is changing their car's oil, Lula waits for him in the hotel room. Peru enters the room and threatens to sexually assault Lula, forcing her to ask him to have sex with her, before leaving, stating he has no time. This traumatizes Lula, who was raped as a child.

Not knowing about Peru's abuse of Lula, Sailor agrees to accompany him to a bar. Over beers, Peru enlists Sailor's help in robbing a nearby feed store, which allegedly keeps $5,000 in cash on hand. The robbery goes spectacularly wrong when Peru unnecessarily shoots the two store clerks. Peru then admits to Sailor that he has been hired to kill him, and Sailor realizes he has been given a pistol with dummy ammunition. Chasing Sailor out of the store, Peru is about to kill him when the sheriff's deputy opens fire on him and Peru blows his own head off with his own shotgun. Sailor is arrested and sentenced to six years in prison.

While Sailor is in jail, Lula has their child. Upon his release, Lula decides to reunite with him. Rejecting her mother's objections over the phone, she throws water over her mother's photograph and goes to pick up Sailor with their son. When they meet Sailor, he reveals he will be leaving them both, having decided that mother and son are better off without his influence. While he is walking a short distance away, Sailor encounters a gang whose members surround him. He insults them, and they quickly knock him out. While unconscious, he sees a vision in the form of Glinda the Good Witch, who tells him, "Don't turn away from love, Sailor." When he awakens, Sailor apologizes to the men, tells them he realizes the error of his ways, and then runs after Lula. The photograph of Marietta, in Lula's house, sizzles and vanishes. As there is a traffic jam on the road, Sailor begins to run over the roofs and hoods of the cars to get back to Lula and their child in the car. Sailor sings "Love Me Tender" to Lula, having earlier said that he would only sing that song to his wife.

Cast

 Nicolas Cage as "Sailor" Ripley: the actor described his character as "a kind of romantic Southern outlaw". Cage said in an interview that he was "always attracted to those passionate, almost unbridled romantic characters, and Sailor had that more than any other role I'd played." Prior to being cast in the film, Cage had met Lynch several times at Musso & Frank Grill, which they both frequented. When Lynch read Gifford's novel, he immediately wanted Cage to play Sailor.
 Laura Dern as Lula Pace Fortune: previously, Dern had played a supporting role in Lynch's film, Blue Velvet. For Dern, Wild at Heart was the first opportunity she had "to play not only a very sexual person, but also someone who was, in her own way, incredibly comfortable with herself". When Lynch read Gifford's novel, he immediately thought of Dern to play Lula.
 Diane Ladd as Marietta Fortune, Lula's overbearing mother, who forbids Lula and Sailor's relationship; she forms a grudge against Sailor after he rejects her advances. Ladd and Dern are mother and daughter in real life.
 Willem Dafoe as Bobby Peru
 Harry Dean Stanton as Johnnie Farragut
 Isabella Rossellini as Perdita Durango
 Calvin Lockhart as Reggie
 J. E. Freeman as Marcellus Santos
 W. Morgan Sheppard as Mr. Reindeer
 Crispin Glover as Dell
 Grace Zabriskie as Juana Durango
 Marvin Kaplan as Uncle Pooch
 David Patrick Kelly as "Dropshadow"
 Freddie Jones as George Kovich
 John Lurie as "Sparky"
 Jack Nance as "00 Spool"
 Pruitt Taylor Vince as Buddy
 Sherilyn Fenn as Girl In Accident
 Frances Bay as Madam
 Frank Collison as Timmy Thompson
 Sheryl Lee as The Good Witch
 Charlie Spradling as Irma
 Peter Bromilow as Hotel Manager
 Sally Boyle as Aunt Rootie
 Gregg Dandridge as Bobby Ray Lemon
 Koko Taylor as Zanzibar Singer

Production
In the summer of 1989, Lynch had finished the pilot episode for the successful television series Twin Peaks, and tried to rescue two of his projects—Ronnie Rocket and One Saliva Bubble—both involved in contractual complications as a result of the bankruptcy of Dino De Laurentiis, which had been bought by Carolco Pictures. Lynch stated, 'I've had a bad time with obstacles...it wasn't Dino's fault, but when his company went down the tubes, I got swallowed up in that.' Independent production company Propaganda Films commissioned Lynch to develop an updated noir screenplay based on a 1940s crime novel, while Monty Montgomery, a friend of Lynch's and an associate producer on Twin Peaks, asked novelist Barry Gifford what he was working on. Gifford happened to be writing the manuscript for Wild at Heart: The Story of Sailor and Lula but still had two more chapters to write. He let Montgomery read it in pre-published galley form while the producer was working on the pilot episode for Twin Peaks. Montgomery read it, and two days later he called Gifford and told him that he wanted to make a film of it. Two days after that, Montgomery gave Gifford's book to Lynch while he was editing the pilot, asking him if he would executive produce a film adaptation that he would direct. Lynch remembers telling him, 'That's great Monty, but what if I read it and fall in love with it and want to do it myself?' Montgomery did not think that Lynch would like the book because he did not think it was his 'kind of thing'. Lynch loved the book and called Gifford soon afterwards, asking him if he could make a film of it. Lynch remembers, 'It was just exactly the right thing at the right time. The book and the violence in America merged in my mind and many different things happened.' Lynch was drawn to what he saw as 'a really modern romance in a violent world—a picture about finding love in Hell', and was also attracted to 'a certain amount of fear in the picture, as well as things to dream about. So it seems truthful in some way'.

Lynch got approval from Propaganda to switch projects; however, production was scheduled to begin only two months after the rights had been purchased, forcing him to work fast. Lynch had Cage and Dern read Gifford's book and wrote a draft in a week. By Lynch's own admission, his first draft was 'depressing and pretty much devoid of happiness, and no one wanted to make it'. Lynch did not like the ending in Gifford's book, where Sailor and Lula split up for good. For Lynch, 'it honestly didn't seem real, considering the way they felt about each other. It didn't seem one bit real! It had a certain coolness, but I couldn't see it.' It was at this point that the director's love of The Wizard of Oz (1939) began to influence the script he was writing, and he included a reference to the 'yellow brick road'. Lynch remembers, 'It was an awful tough world, and there was something about Sailor being a rebel. But a rebel with a dream of the Wizard of Oz is kinda like a beautiful thing.' Samuel Goldwyn Jr. read an early draft of the screenplay and did not like Gifford's ending either, so Lynch changed it. However, the director was worried that this change made the film too commercial, 'much more commercial to make a happy ending yet, if I had not changed it, so that people wouldn't say I was trying to be commercial, I would have been untrue to what the material was saying.'

Lynch added new characters, such as Mr. Reindeer and Sherilyn Fenn as the victim of a car accident. During rehearsals, Lynch began talking about Elvis Presley and Marilyn Monroe with Cage and Dern. He also acquired a copy of Elvis' Golden Records and after listening to it, called Cage and told him that he had to sing two songs, "Love Me" and "Love Me Tender". Cage agreed, and recorded them so that he could lip-synch to them on the set. Cage asked Lynch if he could wear a snakeskin jacket in the film, and Lynch incorporated it into his script. Before filming started, Dern suggested that she and Cage go on a weekend road trip to Las Vegas in order to bond and get a handle on their characters. Dern remembers, 'We agreed that Sailor and Lula needed to be one person, one character, and we would each share it. I got the sexual, wild, Marilyn, gum-chewing fantasy, female side; Nick's got the snakeskin, Elvis, raw, combustible, masculine side.' Within four months, Lynch began filming on August 9, 1989, in both Los Angeles (including the San Fernando Valley) and New Orleans with a relatively modest budget of $10 million. Originally, Wild at Heart featured more explicit erotic scenes between Sailor and Lula. In one, she has an orgasm while relating to Sailor a dream she had of being ripped open by a wild animal. Another deleted scene had Lula lowering herself onto Sailor's face saying, 'Take a bite of Lula.'

Soundtrack
Wild at Heart features the Chris Isaak song "Wicked Game", for which a music video was made—directed by Lynch, and featuring scenes of Sailor and Lula interspersed with black-and-white footage of Isaak performing the song.

Themes
According to Lynch, one of the film's themes is, 'finding love in Hell'. He has stated: 'For me, it's just a compilation of ideas that come along. The darker ones and the lighter ones, the humorous ones, all working together. You try to be as true as you can to those ideas and try to get them on film.' The film has been compared to Lynch's previous Blue Velvet, with both said to explore the dark side of the United States.

There are various references to The Wizard of Oz, which has been interpreted as indicative of the overall fantasy world of the movie, which Sailor's obsession with the fantasies of Elvis and the couple's fantastical relationship also speak to. Alongside movies released around the same time, such as Quentin Tarantino's Reservoir Dogs (1992), the movie also depicted a previously unseen level of violence. Lynch himself commented on interviews that the book on which the film was based was "exactly the right thing at the right time" and that "Each year we give permission for people to get away with more".

Some critics have postulated that, similar to Blue Velvet, the sudden idealistic ending of perfect happiness is ironic, suggesting that people who have the potential for violence struggle to find true happiness. However, Lynch himself refers to the ending of Wild at Heart as being 'happy', having consciously made the decision to change the original darker ending from the novel.

Release

Distribution
Early test screenings for Wild at Heart did not go well, with the strong violence in some scenes being too much. At the first test screening, 80 people walked out during a graphic torture scene involving Johnnie Farragut. Lynch decided not to cut anything from the film, and at the second screening, 100 walked out during this scene. Lynch remembers: 'By then, I knew the scene was killing the film. So I cut it to the degree that it was powerful but didn't send people running from the theatre.' In retrospect, he said: 'But that was part of what Wild at Heart was about: really insane and sick and twisted stuff going on.'

Wild at Heart was completed one day before it debuted at the 1990 Cannes Film Festival in the 2,400-seat Grand Auditorium. After the screening, it received 'wild cheering' from the audience. When Jury President Bernardo Bertolucci announced the film as the winner of the Palme d'Or at the awards ceremony, the jeers almost drowned out the cheers, with film critic Roger Ebert leading the vocal detractors. Gifford remembers that there was a prevailing mood that the media was hoping Lynch would fail. "All kinds of journalists were trying to cause controversy and have me say something like 'This is nothing like the book' or 'He ruined my book'. I think everybody from Time magazine to What's On in London was disappointed when I said 'This is fantastic. This is wonderful. It's like a big, dark, musical comedy'".

Rating
The Motion Picture Association of America (MPAA) told Lynch that the version of Wild at Heart screened at Cannes would receive an X rating in North America unless cuts were made, as the NC-17 was not in effect in 1990, at the time of the film's release; he was contractually obligated to deliver an R-rated film. Lynch made one change in the scene where Willem Dafoe's character shoots his own head off with a shotgun. Gun smoke was added to tone down the blood and hide the removal of Dafoe's head from his body. Foreign prints were not affected. The Region 1 DVD and all Blu-rays contain the toned-down version of the shotgun scene.

Response

Box office
Wild at Heart opened in the United States on August 17, 1990, in a limited release of only 532 theaters, grossing 2,913,764 in its opening weekend. It went into wide release on August 31 with 618 theaters and grossing an additional $1,858,379. The film ultimately grossed $14,560,247 in North America.

Reception 

Wild at Heart received mixed reviews. On review aggregator Rotten Tomatoes, the film has an approval rating of 66% based on 53 reviews, with a weighted average of 6.5/10. The site's consensus reads: 'One of director David Lynch's more uneven efforts, Wild at Heart is held together by his distinctive sensibilities and compelling work from Nicolas Cage and Laura Dern.' On Metacritic, the film has a weighted average score of 52 out of 100, based on 18 critics, indicating 'mixed or average reviews'.

In his review for the Chicago Sun-Times, Roger Ebert wrote that Lynch 'is a good director, yes. If he ever goes ahead and makes a film about what's really on his mind, instead of hiding behind sophomoric humor and the cop-out of 'parody', he may realize the early promise of his Eraserhead. But he likes the box office prizes that go along with his pop satires, so he makes dishonest movies like this one.' USA Today gave the film one and a half stars out of four and said: "This attempt at a one-up also trumpets its weirdness, but this time the agenda seems forced."

In his review for Sight & Sound magazine, Jonathan Rosenbaum wrote, 'Perhaps the major problem is that despite Cage and Dern's best efforts, Lynch is ultimately interested only in iconography, not characters at all. When it comes to images of evil, corruption, derangement, raw passion and mutilation (roughly in that order), Wild at Heart is a veritable cornucopia.' Richard Combs in his review for Time wrote, "The result is a pile-up, of innocence, of evil, even of actual road accidents, without a context to give significance to the casualties or survivors". Christopher Sharrett, in Cineaste magazine, wrote: 'Lynch's characters are now so cartoony, one is prone to address him more as a theorist than director, except he is not that challenging...one is never sure what Lynch likes or dislikes, and his often striking images are too often lacking in compassion for us to accept him as a chronicler of a moribund landscape a la Fellini.' However, in Rolling Stone, Peter Travers wrote: 'Starting with the outrageous and building from there, he ignites a slight love-on-the-run novel, creating a bonfire of a movie that confirms his reputation as the most exciting and innovative filmmaker of his generation.'

Legacy
Despite mixed initial reviews, Wild at Heart came to be viewed favorably in subsequent years. It was ranked the 47th best film of the 1990s in an IndieWire critics' poll, the 26th greatest film of the same period in a Complex poll, and the 53rd best in Rolling Stones poll.

Awards and honors

American Film Institute recognition:

 AFI's 100 Years... 100 Laughs—Nominated
 AFI's 100 Years...100 Passions—Nominated

References

External links

 
 
 
 

1990 crime films
1990 films
1990 romance films
1990s English-language films
1990s road movies
American black comedy films
American crime films
American neo-noir films
American road movies
American romance films
Films based on American novels
1990 independent films
Films directed by David Lynch
Films produced by Steve Golin
Films scored by Angelo Badalamenti
Films shot in El Paso, Texas
Films shot in New Orleans
Films with screenplays by David Lynch
Palme d'Or winners
PolyGram Filmed Entertainment films
Rating controversies in film
Romantic crime films
The Samuel Goldwyn Company films
1990s American films